6V or 6-V may refer to:

6V, IATA code for Mars RK airlines
6v, abbreviations for 6 volts
6V, abbreviation for 6-valve engine
6V-71, engine used in  Detroit Diesel Series 71
6V-92, engine used in  Detroit Diesel Series 92 
6V, the production code for the 1985 Doctor Who serial Vengeance on Varos

See also
V6 (disambiguation)
VVVVVV